Shuwa, or Shuwa Madagali, is a town in Madagali, Adamawa State, Nigeria.

References 

Populated places in Adamawa State